The African Monetary Union (AMU) is the proposed creation of an economic and monetary union for the countries of the African Union, administered by the African Central Bank. Such a union would call for the creation of a new unified currency, similar to the euro; the hypothetical currency is sometimes referred to as the afro or afriq.

The Abuja Treaty, an international agreement signed on June 3, 1991, in Abuja, Nigeria, created the African Economic Community, and called for an African Central Bank to follow by 2028. , the plan is to establish an African Economic Community with a single currency by 2023.

Regional currency unions
There are two existing regional currency unions in Africa, using the West African CFA franc, and the Central African CFA franc, respectively. Additionally, the Common Monetary Area links several countries in Southern Africa based on the South African rand.

The African Union's plans for further integration encourage the development of more such regional unions as an intermediate step to full monetary union. One proposed union is the eco, a proposed currency for members of the Economic Community of West African States (ECOWAS).

AFRO prototype art project
In 2002, Mansour Ciss and Baruch Gottlieb created a "prototype" currency, called the AFRO, which they presented at the Dakar Biennale of Contemporary African Art on May 10. It was designed by Dr. Professor Boamh. The project was a response to the perceived lack of independence created by use of the CFA franc. Notes and coins of the imaginary currency were produced, and given away or sold to the people of Dakar and Senegal to encourage them "to reflect on the meaning (value) of money and the future of their own local currency".

Membership
In 2015, Anthony Maruping stated that Kenya, Uganda, Tanzania, Rwanda and Burundi were committed to join a common currency in the next ten years. So far only three of the 53 member states of the African Union in 2009 have committed to using the currency (in 2022, the African Union has 55 members).

Egypt, Eswatini, and Lesotho have logged reservations over the precise date of monetary union and have requested a two- to three-year delay.

Seychelles may not join as a result of economic fears and may, along with Cape Verde, attempt to join the euro at a later date, while the official currency of Mayotte is the euro.

African Central Bank
The African Central Bank (ACB) is one of the three financial institutions of the African Union. It will, over time, take over the responsibilities of the African Monetary Fund.

The creation of the ACB, to be completed by 2028, was first agreed upon in the 1991 Abuja Treaty. The 1999 Sirte Declaration called for a speeding up of this process, with creation by 2020.

When it is fully implemented via Pan-African Parliament legislation, the ACB will be the sole issuer of the African single currency (African Monetary Union/Afro), will become the banker of African Governments, will be the banker to Africa's private and public banking institutions, will regulate and supervise the African banking industry, and will set the official interest and exchange rates in conjunction with the African Government's administration.

The current timeline established by the Abuja Treaty calls for a single African currency to be instituted by the African Central Bank by 2028.  Although some countries have reservations about full economic and monetary union, several regional monetary unions already exist, and others are planned.

Signatories
Signatories to the treaty were all members of the Organisation of African Unity (predecessor of the AU) at the time (Eritrea, South Africa, South Sudan and Morocco have since joined):

See also

 Economy of Africa
 Central banks and currencies of Africa
 List of countries by leading trade partners
 International status and usage of the euro
 International use of the U.S. dollar
 Internationalization of the renminbi
 Special drawing rights
 Amero, theoretical North American currency union
 Canadian dollar
 Euro
 United States dollar

 List of African countries by GDP growth
 List of African countries by GDP (nominal)
 List of African countries by GDP (PPP)
 List of countries by credit rating
 List of countries by future gross government debt
 List of countries by public debt
 List of countries by tax revenue as percentage of GDP

 List of trade blocs
 African Union
 Arab League
 European Union
 Monetary union
 Eastern Caribbean dollar, monetary union by several Eastern Caribbean nations
 Eco, proposed Western Africa currency 
 Khaleeji (currency), another attempt at a common currency, within the Arab community
 Sucre (currency), A commodity based currency system of Lat-Am & Caribe

References

External links
 Dr. Karis Muller, Australian National University: The Euro And African Monetary Integration, in Humanitas Journal of European Studies, Volume I, Issue 1, November 2007
 Dr. Karis Muller, Australian National University: The Euro And African Monetary Integration, in Humanitas Journal of European Studies, Volume I, Issue 1, November 2007
 The Euro And African Monetary Integration in Humanitas Journal of European Studies, Volume I, Issue 1, December 2007
 Text of the Abuja Treaty – from the African Union

Currency unions
Currencies of Africa
Economy of the African Union
Proposed currencies